AMP Life is a superannuation, retirement investments and life insurance company based in Australia and New Zealand. It currently employs 1,000 people and manages $55 billion in funds for its 1.5 million customers. Its CEO is Megan Beer. The company was created by AMP Limited and is now owned by Resolution Life Australia, which in turn is part of the Bermuda-registered holding company, Resolution Life Group Holdings Ltd. AMP holds a 20% stake in the new company as the AMP leadership sees the ongoing relationship as being one of partnership. The AMP branding is expected to continue into the foreseeable future. The new business is being supported by AMP for a two-year period and all services commitments to customers remain unchanged.

History 

Life insurance was the very first financial product offered to customers by AMP in 1849. It remained a core business for the group until 2020. Notification of the sale of AMP Life to Resolution Life was announced to the market on 25 October 2018. The plan was briefly “derailed” when the New Zealand aspects of the deal were blocked by the Reserve Bank of New Zealand though this was later resolved. On 15 May 2020, the market was notified that AMP Life's retirement investments and life insurance products would now be under one trustee and super fund. All policies made with AMP have continued to be honoured, as have services to customers and advisers.

References 

Superannuation funds in Australia
Life insurance companies
Insurance companies of Australia
2018 establishments in Australia
Australian companies established in 2018